Founded in 1964, Federation of Automobile Dealers Associations (FADA) and pronounced as F A D A, is the apex national body of Automotive Retail Industry in India engaged in the sale, service and spares of 2/3 Wheelers, Passenger Cars, UVs, Commercial Vehicles (including buses and trucks) and Tractors. FADA India represents over 15,000 automobile dealers having 26,500 dealerships including multiple Associations of Automobile Dealers at the Regional, State and City levels representing the entire Auto Retail Industry. Together it employs ~4 million people at dealerships and service centres.

FADA India, at the same time also actively networks with the Industries and the authorities, both at the Central & State levels to provide its inputs and suggestions on the Auto Policy, Taxation, Vehicle Registration Procedure, Road Safety and Clean Environment, etc. to sustain the growth of the Automobile Retail Trade in India.

Mr Saharsh Damani is the first CEO of FADA.

External links 
 Official FADA website

Motor trade associations
Organizations established in 1964
Automotive industry in India
Trade associations based in India